Minuscule 490 (in the Gregory-Aland numbering), ε 106 (in the Soden numbering), is a Greek minuscule manuscript of the New Testament, on parchment. Palaeographically it has been assigned to the 11th-century. 
Scrivener labeled it by number 574.
The manuscript is lacunose.

Description 

The codex contains the text of the four Gospels on 192 parchment leaves (size ) with some lacunae. The text is written in two columns per page, 27 lines per page.

There is also a division according to the Ammonian Sections (in Mark 234 Sections, the last in 16:9), with references to the Eusebian Canons.

Text 

The Greek text of the codex is a representative of the Byzantine text-type. Aland placed it in Category V.
According to the Claremont Profile Method it represents the textual family Kx in Luke 1, Luke 10, and Luke 20. It belongs to 51 manuscripts which are, according to Hermann von Soden, related to the Byzantine commentated text (codices 53, 902).

History 

The manuscript once belonged to Claudius James Rich, consul in Baghdad. It was bought in 1825 for the British Museum.

The manuscript was added to the list of New Testament manuscripts by Scrivener (574) and Gregory (490). It was examined by Scrivener and Bloomfield.

It is currently housed at the British Library (Add MS 7141) in London.

See also 

 List of New Testament minuscules
 Biblical manuscript
 Textual criticism

References

Further reading 

 T. K. Abbott, Hermathena XVIII (1892), pp. 233–234.

Greek New Testament minuscules
11th-century biblical manuscripts
British Library additional manuscripts